First Lutheran Church is a historic church at 909 Tuscarawas Street East, Canton, Ohio that is listed on the National Register of Historic Places.

References

External links 

Churches in Stark County, Ohio
National Register of Historic Places in Stark County, Ohio
Churches in Canton, Ohio
Tourist attractions in Canton, Ohio